The 1975 Western Michigan Broncos football team represented Western Michigan University in the Mid-American Conference (MAC) during the 1975 NCAA Division I football season.  In their first season under head coach Elliot Uzelac, the Broncos compiled a 1-10 record (0/7 against MAC opponents), finished in ninth place in the MAC, and were outscored by their opponents, 297 to 119.  The team played its home games at Waldo Stadium in Kalamazoo, Michigan.

The team's statistical leaders included Sollie Boone with 318 passing yards, Dan Matthews with 873 rushing yards, and Ted Forrest with 286 receiving yards. Linebacker Duncan McKerracher and fullback/middle guard Jim White were the team captains. For the second consecutive year, fullback Dan Matthews received the team's most outstanding player award.

Uzelac was hired as Western Michigan's head football coach in December 1974.  Uzelac was 33 years old at the time of his hiring. He was a Western Michigan alumnus, having graduated in 1964. He had served previously as an assistant coach for the Michigan Wolverines and Detroit Lions.

Schedule

References

Western Michigan
Western Michigan Broncos football seasons
Western Michigan Broncos football